The New Bedford Subdivision is a freight railroad line in the U.S. state of Massachusetts owned by the Massachusetts Bay Transit Authority, with freight operations handled by the Massachusetts Coastal Railroad. The line runs from the end of the CSX Middleboro Subdivision near Weir Village (in Taunton) south to New Bedford along a former New York, New Haven and Hartford Railroad line. It joins the Fall River Subdivision at Myricks (in Berkley).

History
The New Bedford and Taunton Railroad completed the line from Taunton south to New Bedford in 1840. It became part of the NYNH&H until 1968. Penn Central took over in 1968, Then Conrail took over in 1976. The New Bedford subdivision was assigned to CSX in 1999 after the breakup of Conrail.

On October 2, 2008, the state government announced an agreement with CSX Transportation for the purchase and upgrade of several of CSX's freight lines in the state. CSX agreed to sell the Fall River Secondary and New Bedford Secondary for use by the South Coast Rail project, as well as the Grand Junction Branch, the Framingham-to-Worcester section of the Worcester Line, and the South Boston Running Track. Other parts of the agreement included plans for double-stack freights west of Worcester and the abandonment of Beacon Park Yard. The agreement was signed on September 23, 2009. On June 11, 2010, the state and CSX completed the first phase of the agreement, including the transfer of the South Coast Rail lines to MassDOT; the Massachusetts Coastal Railroad assumed freight rights on the two lines. The two lines were sold for $21.5 million.

See also
List of CSX Transportation lines

References

CSX Transportation lines
Rail infrastructure in Massachusetts
Old Colony Railroad lines